Scoreloop, a subsidiary of BlackBerry, was a cross-platform social gaming network for the operating systems including BlackBerry (Tablet OS and BlackBerry 10), Android, Bada, iOS and Windows Phone 7.

History
The company, based in Munich, Germany, raised US$2.8 million to help create the service that they founded in 2008. Early Investors included Earlybird Venture Capital and Target Partners. In March 2010, Scoreloop gave developers that used its service the ability to monetize their apps using the company's services. The network was among the first to add support for Android apps.

During August 2010, Scoreloop revealed that its user base was growing by over 100,000 new users per day.

On June 7, 2011, Scoreloop was acquired by BlackBerry for US$71 million.

On July 8, 2014, BlackBerry announced that the Scoreloop service is to be discontinued starting December 1, 2014 and encouraged all developers to remove all Scoreloop features and integrations from their developed games.

References

External links
 

2008 software
IOS software
Android (operating system) software
Bada software
Windows Phone software